Qaleh-ye Kaduyeh (also Romanized as Qal‘eh-ye Kadūyeh; also known as Kadūyeh) is a village in Khosuyeh Rural District, in the Central District of Zarrin Dasht County, Fars Province, Iran. At the 2006 census, its population was 179, in 48 families.

References 

Populated places in Zarrin Dasht County